Falkland is a historic plantation house located at Redd Shop, Prince Edward County, Virginia. It was built about 1750, and the frame dwelling consists of a two-story, four bay, central block with one-story flanking wings. It has a hall-and-parlor plan. A two-story, two bay frame rear ell was added in the 1850s.

It was listed on the National Register of Historic Places in 1979.

References

Plantation houses in Virginia
Houses on the National Register of Historic Places in Virginia
Houses completed in 1815
Houses in Prince Edward County, Virginia
National Register of Historic Places in Prince Edward County, Virginia